PCAM may refer to:

 Pacific Coast Association of Magicians, an American association of illusionists
 Pedestrian crash avoidance mitigation, the use of AI to recognize pedestrians and avoid crashes
 Professional Community Association Manager
 Pacific Coast Air Museum, a non-profit organization dedicated to promoting and preserving aviation history
 Platelet/endothelial cell adhesion molecule, an adhesion molecule on the surface of platelets, monocytes, neutrophils, and some types of T-cells